Baringa is a new suburb in the Sunshine Coast Region, Queensland, Australia. It was established in 2017.

History 
Baringa is situated in the Gubbi Gubbi (Kabi) traditional Aboriginal country.  The name Baringa comes from the Gubbi-Gubbi language and means summit or little mountain.

The locality of Baringa was excised from Bells Creek on 18 August 2017. It was created to accommodate residential population growth in the Caloundra South Priority Development Area. The first residential land sales commenced in August 2016 with the expectation of homes being occupied from 2017. Baringa is part of a $5 billion master-planned community being developed by Stockland and is expected to accommodate 50,000 people after 30 years.

Baringa State Primary School opened in 2018 on the highest point in the residential area. The school had an initial capacity of 470 students with plans to accommodate 1,100 students within its first 5 to 8 years. The founding principal was Noel Baggs. The school was designed to have an emphasis on science, technology, engineering, and mathematics (STEM).

Construction of Baringa State Secondary College commenced in March 2020, opening at the start of 2021 for its first student intake of Years 7 and 8 students.

Education 
Baringa State Primary School is a government primary (P–6) school on Baringa Drive.

Baringa State Secondary College is a  government secondary (7–12) school on the corner of Griffith Place and Baringa Drive.

References 

Suburbs of the Sunshine Coast Region